The University of Wisconsin–Platteville Richland (formerly University of Wisconsin-Richland) is a two-year campus of the University of Wisconsin System located in Richland Center, Wisconsin, United States. The college is a satellite campus of the University of Wisconsin–Platteville.

UW–Richland is one of thirteen freshman-sophomore liberal arts transfer campuses of the University of Wisconsin Colleges, and offers a general education associate degree. In addition, UW-Richland offers the Bachelor of Applied Arts & Sciences.

Campus
UW–Richland has seven main buildings—Classroom Building, East Hall, Melvill Hall, Miller Memorial Library, Roadrunner Gymnasium, Science Hall, and Wallace Student Center/Coppertop Theatre. Improvements and expansions include construction of the community's on-campus Symons Recreation Complex in 1987, Campus View student housing in 1987, expanded in 1988 and 1999, renovation and expansion of Melvill Hall in 1998, and Science Hall in 2001. East Hall, a former county building adjacent to the campus, was renovated and became the newest UW-Richland building in 2010.

History
Known today as the University of Wisconsin–Platteville Richland, the present campus opened in 1967 as the Richland Branch Campus of the Wisconsin State University-Platteville (now known as the University of Wisconsin–Platteville). With the 1972 merger of the University of Wisconsin and State University Systems, the campus became part of the University of Wisconsin Center System and was known as UW Center-Richland. In 1997, the name of the institution was changed to the University of Wisconsin Colleges and the campus name to UW–Richland. In July 2018, the UW Colleges system was restructured, and UW–Richland again became a satellite campus of UW–Platteville. In August 2018, the name was changed to the University of Wisconsin–Platteville Richland. On November, 22, 2022 the University of Wisconsin System announced plans to end in-person classes at the campus, citing enrollment declines.

Academics
The campus offers an array of courses to begin any of more than 200 majors. Many UW–Richland students mark completion of the first half of a bachelor's degree by earning the Associate of Arts and Science degree or use the Guaranteed Transfer Program, under which students are guaranteed admission to a four-year University of Wisconsin System campus of their choice if they meet certain academic requirements.

Special programs
Since the mid-1980s, UW–Richland has been a partner in several international programs, bringing students from around the world to Richland Center to live and learn. An array of activities enhances outside-the-classroom learning and includes Student Senate/student government, Phi Theta Kappa honor society, International Club, Student Wisconsin Education Association chapter Educators of the Future and more.

Athletics
A member of the Wisconsin Collegiate Conference, UW–Richland offers men's and women's basketball and women's volleyball, as well as club soccer and intramural sports. Students have discounted access to Symons Recreation Complex and they may swim for free there. UW–Richland's mascot is the Roadrunner and school colors are royal blue and white, with red accents.

References

External links
UW–Richland Official website

University of Wisconsin-Platteville Richland
Education in Richland County, Wisconsin
Educational institutions established in 1967
Buildings and structures in Richland County, Wisconsin
Two-year colleges in the United States
Richland
Richland